, better known as , is a Japanese actor, bassist, and composer. He graduated from Tokyo Metropolitan Ogikubo High School and later graduated from Toho Gakuen College of Drama and Music.

Nakamura also has relatives who are kabuki actors.
Great-grandfather: Nakamura Kanemon II.
Grandfather: Nakamura Kanemon III.
Father: Nakamura Umenosuke IV.

Nakamura learned about kabuki and modern theater at the Zenshinza troupe. Nakamura took on the name of his great-grandfather Baijaku in 1980 during the 50th Anniversary Performance of Zenshinza and became "Baijaku II". At the final performance of Otose in 2007, Nakamura announced he was leaving Zenshinza and turning freelance.

Filmography

TV series

Films

References

External links
  

1955 births
Japanese composers
Japanese male actors
Japanese male composers
Living people
People from Tokyo
Male actors from Tokyo
Musicians from Tokyo